The governor-general of the Union of South Africa was the highest state official in the Union of South Africa between 31 May 1910 and 31 May 1961. The Union of South Africa was founded as a self-governing Dominion of the British Empire in 1910 and the office of governor-general was established as the representative of the monarch. Fifty-one years later the country declared itself a republic and the historic link with the British monarchy was broken. The office of governor-general was abolished.

Some of the first holders of the post were members of the British royal family including Prince Arthur of Connaught between 1920 and 1924, and the Earl of Athlone, who served between 1924 and 1931, before becoming the governor general of Canada. As in other Dominions, this would change, and from 1943 onward only South Africans (in fact, only Afrikaners) held the office.

The office was established by the South Africa Act 1909. Although the governor-general was nominally the country's chief executive, in practice he was bound by convention to act on the advice of the prime minister and the cabinet of South Africa.

Republicanism 

The Afrikaner-dominated National Party, which came to power in 1948, was avowedly republican and regarded South Africa's personal union with the United Kingdom and other realms within the Commonwealth of Nations as a relic of British imperialism. In the interim, the National Party used the governor-general's post as a sinecure for retired National Party ministers. The two governors-general appointed after 1948, Ernest George Jansen and Charles Robberts Swart, chose not to wear the traditional court uniform nor even to take an oath of allegiance to the monarch.

In 1957, God Save the Queen ceased to have equal status with Die Stem van Suid-Afrika as a national anthem, and the Union Flag similarly ceased to have equal status with the South African flag.

However, it was not until 1960 that Prime Minister Hendrik Verwoerd advised Governor-General Swart to hold a referendum on the issue. After several protests regarding the lowering of the voting age to 18, and the inclusion of white voters in South West Africa, on 5 October 1960 white South Africans were asked: Are you in favour of a Republic for the Union? The result was 52 per cent in favour of the change.

Swart, the last governor-general, asked Queen Elizabeth II to relieve him of his duties on 30 April 1961, after he signed the new republican constitution into law. Chief Justice Lucas Cornelius Steyn became Officer Administering the Government under a transitional arrangement until 31 May 1961, when the Republic of South Africa was declared and Swart became the first state president of South Africa.

List of governors-general of South Africa 

The following is a list of people who served as governor-general of South Africa from independence in 1910 to the establishment of a republic in 1961.

Symbols
 Died in office.

Flag of the Governor-General

See also 

State President of South Africa
President of South Africa
Prime Minister of South Africa

Notes 

1910 establishments in South Africa
1961 disestablishments in South Africa
History of South Africa
South Africa
Governor-General
South Africa and the Commonwealth of Nations